WJVO (105.5 FM) is a radio station broadcasting a country music format, licensed to South Jacksonville, Illinois, the station serves the Jacksonville, Illinois area. WJVO is owned by Sarah Shellhammer, through licensee Morgan County Media LLC.

Translator
WJVO's HD2 subchannel is also broadcast on the following translator:

References

External links
WJVO's official website

JVO
Companies based in Morgan County, Illinois